Kirkup is a surname. Notable people with the surname include:

 Dan Kirkup (born 1988), English footballer
 James Kirkup (1918–2009), English poet
 Joe Kirkup (born 1939), English footballer
 Seymour Kirkup (1788–1880), English painter
 Toby Kirkup (1972–2020), English actor, writer and television presenter, known for his role as a police sergeant on Peaky Blinders
 Zak Kirkup (born 1987), Australian politician